Rumanja Vas is a village in the Municipality of Straža in southeastern Slovenia. It lies on the right bank of the Krka River on the regional road from Dolenjske Toplice to Novo Mesto. The area is part of the historical region of Lower Carniola. The municipality is now included in the Southeast Slovenia Statistical Region.

References

External links
Rumanja Vas at Geopedia

Populated places in the Municipality of Straža